The Stockton Challenger is a professional tennis tournament played on hard courts. It is currently part of the ATP Challenger Tour and the International Tennis Federation (ITF) Women's Circuit. It has been held annually in Stockton, California, United States since 2015.

Past finals

Men's singles

Women's singles

Men's doubles

Women's doubles

External links 
 
 ITF search

ITF Women's World Tennis Tour
ATP Challenger Tour
Hard court tennis tournaments in the United States
Recurring sporting events established in 2015
Tennis in California
2015 establishments in California
Sports in Stockton, California